Pseudodinera is a genus of parasitic flies in the family Tachinidae.

Species
Pseudodinera nigripes Brauer & von Bergenstamm, 1891
Pseudodinera spinigera (Thomson, 1869)

References

Dexiinae
Taxa named by Friedrich Moritz Brauer
Taxa named by Julius von Bergenstamm
Diptera of Africa
Tachinidae genera